Willie Montae Reagor (born June 29, 1977) is a former defensive tackle who spent nine seasons in the National Football League (NFL). He played college football for Texas Tech University, and he was recognized as an All-American. He was drafted by the Denver Broncos in the second round of the 1999 NFL Draft, and also played for the Broncos, Indianapolis Colts (with whom he won Super Bowl XLI) and Philadelphia Eagles of the NFL. Reagor was a coaching intern for the Eagles in 2011.

He sold his Super Bowl XLI ring on the famous TV show Pawn Stars.

Early years
Reagor was born in Waxahachie, Texas.  He attended Waxahachie High School, and was a standout high school football player for the Waxahachie Indians.

College career
Reagor attended Texas Tech University, and was a four-year starter for the Texas Tech Red Raiders football team.  He started in 41 of 44 career games, and holds the Red Raiders' team record with 24.5 sacks and 47 tackles for loss.  As a senior in 1998, he had 96 tackles, seven sacks and 19 tackles for losses, which earned him consensus first-team All-America and first-team All-Big 12 first-team honors.

Professional career

Denver Broncos
Reagor was drafted by the Denver Broncos in the second round of the 1999 NFL Draft. He spent four seasons with the Broncos, from 1999 to 2002.

Indianapolis Colts
Reagor signed with the Indianapolis Colts in 2003, and remained a Colt through the 2006 season.

Automobile accident
On October 22, 2006, Reagor was involved in an automobile accident on his way to that Sunday's game against the Washington Redskins. Reagor suffered a broken orbital bone and received 35 stitches in the back of his head. Reagor was later placed on the injured reserve list by the Colts and missed the duration of the season. Reagor still has severe facial damage. After the Colts won Super Bowl XLI, the team terminated his contract on March 1, 2007, due to the severity of his injury.

Philadelphia Eagles
On March 20, 2007, he signed a deal with the Philadelphia Eagles. His signing allowed the Eagles to trade defensive tackle Darwin Walker and a conditional draft pick in 2008 to the Buffalo Bills for linebacker Takeo Spikes and quarterback Kelly Holcomb. Reagor was expected to help Philadelphia's revamped Defensive line. Due to his successful play and return from his severe injuries, Reagor was named as the Philadelphia Eagles recipient for the 2007 Ed Block Courage Award. He was released in the 2008 offseason.

Coaching career
Reagor became a coaching intern for the Eagles during training camp in 2011.

Personal life
His son, Jalen Reagor, plays in the NFL as a wide receiver for the Minnesota Vikings.

References

1977 births
Living people
All-American college football players
American football defensive tackles
Denver Broncos players
Indianapolis Colts players
People from Waxahachie, Texas
Philadelphia Eagles players
Players of American football from Texas
Texas Tech Red Raiders football players
Waxahachie High School alumni
Ed Block Courage Award recipients